Guru Dakshina may refer to:

 Guru Dakshina (1983 film), a 1983 Malayalam film
 Guru Dakshina (1987 film), a 1987 Bengali film
 Ek Adbhut Dakshina Guru Dakshina, a 2015 Hindi film